The following is a list of Cal State Fullerton Titans men's basketball head coaches. There have been 11 head coaches of the Titans in their 63-season history.

Cal State Fullerton's current head coach is Dedrique Taylor. He was hired in March 2013 to replace Andy Newman, who was not retained after spending the 2012–13 season as the Titans' interim head coach.

References

Cal State Fullerton

Cal State Fullerton Titans men's basketball coaches